The India women's cricket team toured England to play against the England women's cricket team in September 2022. The tour consisted of three Women's One Day Internationals (WODIs) and three Women's Twenty20 Internationals (WT20Is). The WODI matches were part of 2022–2025 ICC Women's Championship, with the final match of the tour taking place at Lord's.

In August 2022, India named their squads for the tour and it was announced that Jhulan Goswami would retire from international cricket after playing the series. On 8 September 2022, England captain Nat Sciver announced that she decided to withdraw from the series "to focus on her mental health and well being". Amy Jones was named as England's captain for the WT20I series. Eventually, Jones was named as captain for England's WODI squad.

England won the first WT20I by 9 wickets, as the match started with both the teams and match officials paying tribute to Queen Elizabeth II following her death on 8 September. India won the second WT20I by 8 wickets, to level the series 1–1. England claimed the series 2–1 after winning the third match by 7 wickets.

India won the first two matches of the WODI series to get an unassailable lead, winning their first series in this format in England since 1999. India won the last WODI to clean sweep the series 3–0.

Squads

On 12 September 2022, Alice Davidson-Richards was added to England's WT20I squad for the remaining two matches.

Warm-up match

WT20I series

1st WT20I

2nd WT20I

3rd WT20I

WODI series

1st WODI

2nd WODI

3rd WODI

References

External links
 Series home at ESPNcricinfo

Women's cricket tours of England
2022 in Indian cricket
2022 in English cricket
International cricket competitions in 2022
England 2022
cricket
2022 in women's cricket